Naia Leonet (born 20 December 1997) is a Spanish professional racing cyclist who rides for Bizkaia–Durango.

See also
 List of 2016 UCI Women's Teams and riders

References

External links
 

1997 births
Living people
Spanish female cyclists
Place of birth missing (living people)
People from Errenteria
Sportspeople from Gipuzkoa
Cyclists from the Basque Country (autonomous community)